"Theme of the Traitor and the Hero" (original Spanish title: "Tema del traidor y del héroe") is a short story by the Argentine writer Jorge Luis Borges, originally published in 1944 in number 112 of the review Sur.

Plot
For the centenary of the death of Fergus Kilpatrick, an Irish nationalist hero who led a group of Irish conspirators, and was assassinated in 1824, a descendant called Ryan is preparing a biography. Kilpatrick was killed in a theatre by unknown assailants, with a letter on his body warning him he faced death and after a soothsayer had predicted his end. Spotting these parallels with Shakespeare's plays, Ryan discovers that the oldest of the conspirators, Nolan, was the translator of Shakespeare into Gaelic. Eventually, Ryan works out that the nationalists knew they had been betrayed to the British authorities and Kilpatrick admitted he was the informer.  After sentencing him to death,  Nolan agreed to make his passing a memorable event in Irish history. So Nolan hastily faked the Shakespearean echoes and out of a sordid plot a hero was born. Ryan decides to leave the myth intact.

Literary and philosophical references
In addition to the plays  Julius Caesar and Macbeth, with often heavy irony Borges links his story to many predecessors. Among them are:
Moses, who preceded Kilpatrick as a leader who saw the promised land of freedom for his people but had to die before it was reached.
Hesiod, Vico and Spengler, who saw human history not as linear progress but as a spiral of descent.
Caesar, who saw the British Isles under the grip of obscurantist druids.
Leibniz, who saw the cosmos as an ultimate harmony.
Lincoln, who followed Kilpatrick in becoming a national hero murdered in a theatre.
Browning and Hugo, who in their works celebrated perceived nationalist heroes.
Chesterton, who like Borges enjoyed creating involuted but symmetrical mysteries.

Film adaptation
In 1970 the story was adapted into an Italian film called Strategia del ragno (The Spider's Stratagem), directed by Bernardo Bertolucci. In this version, the conspirators had planned to blow up the Duce Mussolini in 1936 during a performance of Rigoletto.

Sources 
 
 
 

1944 short stories
Mystery short stories
Short stories adapted into films
Short stories by Jorge Luis Borges
Works originally published in Sur (magazine)